The 2003 Capital One Bowl was a post-season college football bowl game between the Penn State Nittany Lions and the Auburn Tigers on January 1, 2003, at the Citrus Bowl in Orlando, Florida. Auburn won the game 13–9; Auburn running back Ronnie Brown was the game's MVP, rushing for 184 yards and two touchdowns.

References

Capital One Bowl
Citrus Bowl (game)
Auburn Tigers football bowl games
Penn State Nittany Lions football bowl games
Capital One Bowl
Capital One Bowl